Camponotus atriceps, previously referred as C. abdominalis, is a species of carpenter ant, endemic to the Americas.

Habitat
It has been found in a variety of moist and forested habitats, including wet lowland and rainforest, tropical rainforests, pine or oak forests, wet montane forest, and in mature wet forest. It occurs from near sea level to as high as 2,290 meters.

Races
There are two accepted races:
 Camponotus atriceps atriceps
 Camponotus atriceps nocens

Parasites
A variety of parasites have been identified from the subspecies, Camponotus abdominalis floridanus. These include the inquilines Microdon fulgens, Myrmecophila pergandei, an undetermined species of Atelurinae, Alachua floridensis and Obeza floridana. The cockroach, Myrmecoblatta wheeleri has also been found associated with the ant in southern Florida.

References

External links

atriceps
Insects described in 1858